Qez Qabri or Qez Qebri, also rendered as Kazkabri, may refer to:

Qez Qabri-ye Bahador
Qez Qabri-ye Doktor Habib
Qez Qabri-ye Ebrahim
Qez Qabri-ye Jahan Bakhsh
Qez Qabri-ye Rashid